Jamal Joratli is a Greece-based businessman and painter of Syrian origin.

Biography

Jamal was born in Salamiyah in 1961, and studied mechanical engineering at the University of Aleppo. He now resides and works in Greece, Athens, which he first visited in 1988. He chose Greece "for its natural light and colors, which cannot be imitated even by the best photoshop application, and for its culture".

Work

Exhibitions of his work have been held in the United States (New York), Germany (Düsseldorf), Lebanon, Jordan, Dubai, China, and Greece. His last solo exhibition (The Silk Road) took place in 2016, first in Athens at the Benaki Museum and then at the Museum of Asian Art of Corfu. In October 2018 the exhibition was transferred to China, at the Dalian Modern Museum.

Style
With his art, Jamal tries to look behind the surfaces, and to harmonically connect the oriental with the occidental artistic schools.

History of art professor Manos Stefanidis regards Jamal as a "pictor classicus" – in the way Giorgio de Chirico used the term, namely a painter first addressing the problem of positioning the subject in space – who integrates modern European painting in his art, "but with terms of locality and an emphasis on the personal agony of expression". According to Stefanidis, Jamal acts as a defender of "cultural reciprocity" between East and West, leading the artistic revival of the Arab world.

Citations

Sources
 
 
 
 
 
 
 

1961 births
Living people
People from Salamiyah
20th-century Syrian painters
21st-century Syrian painters
Syrian contemporary artists